The name Lynn has been used for three tropical cyclones in the Northwestern Pacific Ocean.

Tropical Storm Lynn (1981) (Etang) – traversed the Philippines and Hainan Island before striking Vietnam
Tropical Storm Lynn (1984) – made landfall in Vietnam
Typhoon Lynn (1987) (Pepang) – Violent Typhoon that caused flooding in the Philippines and Taiwan before making landfall in South China

Pacific typhoon set index articles